Antoaneta Pancheva (born 18 June 1984) is a Bulgarian footballer who plays as a defender. She has been a member of the Bulgaria women's national team.

References

1984 births
Living people
Women's association football defenders
Bulgarian women's footballers
Bulgaria women's international footballers
FC NSA Sofia players